Defending champion Kim Clijsters successfully defended her title, defeating Amélie Mauresmo in the final, 6–2, 6–0 to win the singles title at the 2003 WTA Tour Championships. It was her second Tour Finals title, her ninth title of the season, and the 19th of her career.

Seeds

Note: 
  Serena Williams had qualified but pulled out due to left knee surgery.
  Lindsay Davenport had qualified but pulled out due to left foot surgery.
  Venus Williams had qualified but pulled out due to abdominal injury.

Alternates

Draw

Finals

Red group
Standings are determined by: 1. number of wins; 2. number of matches; 3. in two-players-ties, head-to-head records; 4. in three-players-ties, percentage of sets won, or of games won; 5. steering-committee decision.

Black group
Standings are determined by: 1. number of wins; 2. number of matches; 3. in two-players-ties, head-to-head records; 4. in three-players-ties, percentage of sets won, or of games won; 5. steering-committee decision.

See also
WTA Tour Championships appearances

References

Singles 2003
2003 WTA Tour